Flexanthera is a genus of plants in the family Rubiaceae. It contains only one known species, Flexanthera subcordata, endemic to Colombia.

References

Monotypic Rubiaceae genera